The Friday Night Rock Show Sessions / Live at Reading is a live album by British heavy metal band Diamond Head, released in 1992 as part of an official series of similar, radio-archive releases by several bands released with Raw Fruit Records. The Reading Festival performance was later included as part of a selection of bonus live tracks on The MCA Years, while the entire album was included on the compilation Live at the BBC.

Track listing

Notes
 Tracks 1 - 2 from BBC In Session 1980.
 Tracks 3 - 8 recorded at Reading Rock Festival, Reading, England on 27 August 1982 and broadcast on BBC Radio The Friday Rock Show, hosted by DJ Tommy Vance. There, Diamond Head were surprise late replacements for Manowar on the Friday night bill. This late replacement status accounts for the comment Sean Harris makes on the album that "I bet nobody expected us to be on 'ere tonight."
 The version of Sucking My Love on this album was previously released as a 12" single in 1983.

Personnel
Band
 Brian Tatler – lead guitar
 Sean Harris – vocals, guitar
 Colin Kimberley – bass
 Duncan Scott – drums
Miscellaneous staff
 Tony Wilson – producer
 Jerry Paris – cover illustration

References 

Diamond Head (band) live albums
BBC Radio recordings
1992 live albums